Dr. Warren Eugene Amling (December 29, 1924 – November 1, 2001) was an American football and basketball player, playing for the Ohio State Buckeyes from 1944 to 1946. He was inducted into the College Football Hall of Fame in 1984.

In 1945 Amling was a unanimous All-America selection at guard on the Buckeye football team and finished seventh in the vote for the Heisman Trophy  In 1946 he was elected the team captain and volunteered to move to tackle, a position where the team was thinner.  At this new position he was again named an All American by the Sporting News and the Football Writers Association of America.  Amling was inducted into the Ohio State Varsity O Hall of Fame in 1981 and the College Football Hall of Fame in 1984, and was selected to the Ohio State Football All-Century Team (at guard) in 2000.

Amling was also a starter for the Ohio State basketball team.  He is the only member of the College Football Hall of Fame to start in an NCAA Final Four game.

Amling graduated with honors from Ohio State's Veterinary Medicine School in 1947 and turned down a chance to play for the New York Giants, choosing instead to practice veterinary medicine in London, Ohio. He served as a member of the board of directors of Wittenberg University in the late 1970s.

Amling was adjunct associate professor at The Ohio State University College of Veterinary Medicine from 1983 to 1990.

He was chosen in 2000 as a member of the Ohio State Football All-Century Team.

References

External links

 Information from Buckeye Planet

1924 births
2001 deaths
All-American college football players
American football offensive guards
American football offensive tackles
American veterinarians
Male veterinarians
College Football Hall of Fame inductees
People from London, Ohio
Ohio State Buckeyes men's basketball players
Ohio State Buckeyes football players
People from Pana, Illinois
Players of American football from Illinois
American men's basketball players
Ohio State University College of Veterinary Medicine alumni